Dolędzin  is a settlement in the administrative district of Gmina Rudnik, within Racibórz County, Silesian Voivodeship, in southern Poland.

The settlement has a population of 15.

Gallery

References

Villages in Racibórz County